Bengaluru Metropolitan Transport Corporation - (BMTC) is a state-owned public road transport corporation in the Indian city of Bengaluru. It is wholly owned by the Government of Karnataka. It serves the Bengaluru Metropolitan Region.

History

Foundation
Mysore Government Road Transport Department was inaugurated on 12 September 1948 with 120 buses. The transport department of The Mysore state administrated it until 1961.

Corporatization
It was subsequently converted into an independent corporation under Section 3 of the Road Transport Corporation Act, 1950 on 1 August 1961, In 1961, after successfully converting into an independent corporation all assets and liabilities of MGRTD were transferred to Mysore State Road Transport Corporation.

Merger 
On 1 October 1961, Bangalore Transport Service was merged with it.

Renaming
On 1 November 1973, the Mysore state was renamed as Karnataka thus, renaming it Karnataka State Road Transport Corporation.

Bifurcation
 On 15 August 1997, Bengaluru Metropolitan Transport Corporation (then Bangalore Metropolitan Transport Corporation) was bifurcated to cater to the transportation needs of Bengaluru Metropolitan Region. It was formed by separating the Bangalore Transport Service.
 on 1 November 1997, North Western Karnataka Road Transport Corporation was bifurcated to cater to the transportation needs of Northwestern parts of Karnataka.
 On 15 August 2000, Kalyana Karnataka Road Transport Corporation (then North Eastern Karnataka Road Transport Corporation) was bifurcated to cater to the transportation needs of Northeastern parts of Karnataka.
This left the corporation to serve the Southern part of Karnataka.

 On 23 November 2009, Vijayapura division was transferred from NWKRTC to KKRTC.
 On 1 November 2014, It changed to the present name Bengaluru Metropolitain Transport Corporation along with other organizations in the city.

Services
Bengaluru Sarige: It is a non-AC bus service built on Ashok Leyland, Tata and Eicher urban chassis with a dark blue-white livery for BSIV and light blue-white livery for BSVI connecting all parts of the Metropolitan region.
Samparka: It is a mini non-AC bus service built on Ashok Leyland and Tata mini urban chassis with an orange livery connecting neighbourhoods to the nearby bus station. Usually covering shorter distances.
Astra: It is a non-AC electric bus service with a light green livery for JBM brand buses and violet-white for Ashok Leyland's Switch brand buses.
Vajra: It is an AC bus service built on Volvo urban chassis with a light blue livery running on important routes serving the tech parks, industrial areas, major bus stations and major residential areas. 
Vayu Vajra: It is an AC bus service built on Volvo urban chassis with a light blue livery connecting 23 routes in the Metropolitan region to Bengaluru's Kempegowda International Airport. Free Wi-Fi access is provided to the commuters on these buses.
Bengaluru Darshini: It is an AC bus service with a special livery of pencil sketch depiction of important sites in Bengaluru on a white background. This service was introduced for sightseeing in Bengaluru.  It covered routes connecting about twenty landmarks of great historic, religious and scientific significance.

Former services
Parisara Vahini/Parisara Snehi: It is a non-AC bus service with a light blue-white, dark blue, blue-white or grey colour livery over time. Merged with Bengaluru Sarige.
Suvarna: It is a non-AC bus service with a green or red livery, similar fare to Jana Sarige buses served important feeder routes. Merged with Bengaluru Sarige.
Samartha/BIG Trunk: It is a non-AC bus service with a green livery used to serve trunk routes from downtown to the suburbs. Merged with Bengaluru Sarige.
Nera Sarige/BIG 10: It is a non-AC bus service with a special green and bottle green livery plied on 12 major corridors towards the central business district. These buses are numbered with a G prefix. Merged with Bengaluru Sarige.
Samvrutha/BIG Circle: It is a non-AC bus service with a special white BIG Circle livery. These buses use to ply on Bengaluru Inner Ring Road and Bengaluru Outer Ring Road. Buses are numbered with a C prefix or a K prefix. Merged with Bengaluru Sarige.
Metro Feeder: It is a non-AC bus service with a pink-lined grey-white livery. Running as feeder services between stations of Namma Metro. Buses are numbered with a MF prefix. Merged with Bengaluru Sarige.
Atal Sarige: It is a non-AC Low fare bus service with an Indian tri-colour livery. Currently defunct
Pushpak Sarige/Janapriya Vahini: non-AC buses with a beige-white livery used to ply only with a driver who also issues ticket and has only one entrance and exit. Currently defunct.
Marcopolo AC, UD AC and Corona AC: It is an AC low fare bus service with a white or light blue livery plied on select routes. Currently defunct
Nimbus: It is a non-AC bus service with a green livery for BSIV, light blue-white livery for BSVI and AC buses with a light blue livery. These buses ply on special bus rapid transit lanes. The only service between Central Silk Board Junction and Krishnarajapura was temporarily withdrawn and converted to Bengaluru Sarige service as the bus lane had to be closed down due to a decrease in width of Bengaluru Outer Ring Road for the construction of Namma Metro's blue line.

Note: The Parisara Vahini/Parisara Snehi, Suvarna Sarige, Samartha Sarige/BIG Trunk, Nera Sarige/BIG 10, Samvrutha Sarige/BIG Circle, Metro Feeder and Nimbus still retain the same numbering and function in spite of a change in branding.

All Karnataka's Road Transport Corporations
Karnataka State Road Transport Corporation: Operates out of Southern Karnataka.
North Western Karnataka Road Transport Corporation: Operates out of Northwestern Karnataka except Vijayapura district.
Kalyana Karnataka Road Transport Corporation: Operates out of Northeastern Karnataka and Vijayapura district.
Bangalore Metropolitan Transport Corporation: Operates in Bengaluru Metropolitan Region offering transit service.

Smart card
BMTC unveiled a smart card for its bus services for the first time in June 2016. The company introduced smart cards on trial-basis on BMTC Bus No. 335 operating between Majestic and Kadugodi bus stations in March 2017. Apart from serving as an identification document, the smart cards can be used to purchase bus tickets and also swiped at point-of-sale (POS) enabled merchant establishments. Recharges higher than 10,000 require the customer to provide identification. According to Axis Bank, the BMTC's partner in the project, the smart card is India's "first open loop EMV contactless smart card". The cards "open-loop" structure allows other agencies to integrate their smart card schemes by adopting the standards of the BMTC smart card.

Bus Day
Introduced on 4 February 2010, Bus Day is an event calling all the citizens of Bengaluru to use public transport. The idea behind Bus Day is to observe the changes which can be brought in the city in trying to respect environment, traffic situation, health of individuals perception. The 4th of every month is observed as a "Bus Day".

Bus Priority Lane 
BMTC along with BTP initiated the Bus Lanes in Outer Ring Road branded as Nimbus. Bus lanes give priority to buses, cutting down on journey times where roads are congested with other traffic especially private cars and increasing the reliability of buses. The introduction of bus lanes can significantly assist in the reduction of air pollution due to individual cars and traffic pile up because of cars.

Intelligent Transport System
To benefit the commuters and promote the usage of public transportation, the BMTC launched its Intelligent Transport System (ITS) on 25 May 2016. Under this project, BMTC buses were equipped with GPS in a phased manner which would transmit the location of the bus to the ITS control room. A mobile app was launched on the android platform which was made available in two languages, English and Kannada. The app provides information about bus routes and bus stops. Real time location of buses on a particular route can also be tracked, which requires the users to switch on the GPS on their device. In 2017, BMTC would be introduced prepaid smart cards for commuting, which eliminated the need to pay the exact amount of change.

See also
 Bengaluru Metropolitan Land Transport Authority (BMLTA) Bill, 2022
 List of bus depots in Karnataka
 List of bus stations in Karnataka

References

External links

Official website

Transport in Bangalore
Bus companies of India
State road transport corporations of India
State agencies of Karnataka
Metropolitan transport agencies of India
Companies based in Bangalore
1997 establishments in Karnataka
Government agencies established in 1997
Bus transport in Karnataka